= Neab =

Neab is a bi-monthly Kashmiri literary magazine currently published from Greater Boston Area, Massachusetts, USA.

== History and profile ==
Founded by Amin Kamil, Neab was first published from Srinagar, India, in October 1968. Seventeen issues of the magazine were published before its closure in 1970. It was revived by Amin Kamil's son, Muneebur Rahman in July 2005 from Boston, its new home. It published 14 issues from 2005 to 2011. From 2012, it is published bi-monthly in two separate editions—online edition and print edition. Neab was the most popular literary magazines of its time. It not only introduced and published a number of young writers of that era, it also was able to lead the new talent towards modernity. Neab created a literary community which no other subsequent magazine has been able to do. In its new life, the magazine is trying to publish representative contemporary Kashmiri writing produced all over the world.
